Campeonato Paulista Série A2 is the second level of the São Paulo state professional football championship, one of the Brazilian state championships. This tournament is played by 16 teams, in which the two best teams are promoted to Série A1 and the two worst teams are relegated to Série A3.

List of champions

There are all the championship editions, officially recognized by Federação Paulista de Futebol.

Federations

Amateur Era (1916-1946)

APEA - Associação Paulista de Esportes Atléticos
LAF - Liga dos Amadores de Football
FPF - Federação Paulista de Football
LPF - Liga Paulista de Futebol
LFESP - Liga de Futebol do Estado de São Paulo
FPFA - Federação Paulista de Futebol Amador

Professional Era (1947-)

FPF - Federação Paulista de Futebol

Titles by club 

Names change

CA Siléx was changed the name to CE América.
AA São Paulo Alpargatas was changed the name to CA Albion.
Cotonifício Rodolfo Crespi is the currently CA Juventus.
Hespanha is the currently Jabaquara AC.
Ferroviário is the currently Ituano FC.
During a partnership with the food brand Etti, Paulista FC played in some championships under the name "Etti Jundiaí".

Cities change

Oeste FC has moved from Itápolis to Barueri.
Primeiro de Maio FC and Corinthians FC are originally from São Bernardo do Campo. Santo André has emanciped from São Bernardo do Campo in 1938.

Top scorers

See also
Campeonato Paulista
Campeonato Paulista Série A3
Campeonato Paulista Segunda Divisão
Campeonato Paulista Série B2
Campeonato Paulista Série B3
Federação Paulista de Futebol

References

External links
futebolpaulista.com.br
League at soccerway.com
RSSSF

2